Ocinara malagasy is a moth in the Bombycidae family. It was described by Viette in 1965. It is found in Madagascar.

References

Natural History Museum Lepidoptera generic names catalog

Bombycidae
Moths described in 1965